Qingdao Football Club was a professional Chinese football club that participated in the Chinese Super League under licence from the Chinese Football Association (CFA). The team was based in Qingdao and their home stadium was the Qingdao Guoxin Stadium that has a seating capacity of 45,000. The club was owned by Qingdao Central Plaza Business Management Co., Ltd. who formed the team on 29 January 2013.

History

Club history
Qingdao Hainiu F.C. was established on 29 January 2013 by former players and coaches from Shandong that included Qi Wusheng as chairman, Hao Haidong as managerial director and Su Maozhen as general manager. With the financial backing of 20 million Yuan from Qingdao Central Plaza Business Management Co., Ltd the club would choose the name Hainiu (海牛), which means "The Sea Bulls" despite it once being used by Qingdao Jonoon, another football club in Qingdao between 1994 and 2004, hoping to inspire the golden era of Qingdao football. On the field the team would show their dominance within the league and go through the divisions group stage undefeated, while also beating Meixian Super-X and Shenzhen Fengpeng F.C. to reach the play-off final. In the final the club would defeat Hebei Zhongji F.C. 3–1 to gain promotion to the second tier and win a million Yuan in prize money for the game with a further 3 million won throughout the season.

On 31 January 2015, Qingdao Huanghai Pharmaceutical Co., Ltd. purchased a 51% stake of the club. On 3 July 2015, Serbian player Goran Gogić collapsed and lost consciousness after a training session with the club. He died later on the same day. Qingdao Hainiu finished 11th place in the 2015 season. On 30 December 2015, Qingdao Hainiu F.C. changed their name to Qingdao Huanghai F.C. after Qingdao Huanghai Pharmaceutical Co., Ltd. took full charge of the club. Qingdao Huanghai finished level on 59 points with Tianjin Quanjian and Guizhou Zhicheng under Spanish manager Jordi Vinyals in the 2016 season, but their head-to-head points was worse than the other two clubs, thus failing to promote to the Chinese Super League.

In the following 2 years, the club came close to promotion each time but fell short, earning fourth place in the League One. In the 2019 China League One the club earned first place and gained promotion.

Ahead of the 2021 season, Qingdao Huanghai changed their name to Qingdao F.C..

The club dissolved after the 2021 season.

Ownership and naming history

Retired numbers

12 – Club Supporters (the 12th Man) The number was retired in January 2016.

Managerial history
 Su Maozhen (29 January 2013 – 28 July 2015)
 Sun Xinbo (caretaker) (28 July 2015 – 28 Dec 2015)
 Jordi Vinyals (28 December 2015 – 30 July 2019)
 Óscar Céspedes (caretaker) (30 July 2019 – 18 August 2019)
 Juanma Lillo  (18 August 2019 – 5 June 2020)
 Óscar Céspedes (caretaker) (5 June 2020 – 22 July 2020)
 Pablo Machín  (22 July 2020 – 29 July 2020)
 Yang Weijian (caretaker) (29 July 2020 - 4 August 2020)
 Wu Jingui (4 August 2020 - 13 December 2021)
 Yang Weijian (caretaker) (13 December 2021 - 12 January 2022)

Club honours
 China League Two (Third Tier League)
Winners (1) : 2013

China League One(Second TierLeague)
Winners (1) : 2019

Results
All-time League rankings

As of the end of 2020 season.

 In group stage
 The league is in progress

Key
<div>

 Pld = Played
 W = Games won
 D = Games drawn
 L = Games lost
 F = Goals for
 A = Goals against
 Pts = Points
 Pos = Final position

 DNQ = Did not qualify
 DNE = Did not enter
 NH = Not Held
 – = Does Not Exist
 R1 = Round 1
 R2 = Round 2
 R3 = Round 3
 R4 = Round 4

 F = Final
 SF = Semi-finals
 QF = Quarter-finals
 R16 = Round of 16
 Group = Group stage
 GS2 = Second Group stage
 QR1 = First Qualifying Round
 QR2 = Second Qualifying Round
 QR3 = Third Qualifying Round

Notable players
Had international caps for their respective countries.

China
 Qu Bo
 Wan Houliang
 Jiang Kun
 Zhang Jiaqi
 Deng Zhuoxiang
 Wang Dong
 Zou Zheng
 Liu Jian
 Zhu Ting
Africa
 Joseph Minala
 Yves Ekwalla Hermann
 Kelly Youga
 Yaya Touré
 Emmanuel Agyemang-Badu
Asia
 Yaki Yen
 Godfred Karikari
 Kim Seung-Yong

Europe
 Vladimir Voskoboinikov
 Romain Alessandrini
 Fredrik Ulvestad
 Ricardo Vaz Tê
 Jagoš Vuković
 Goran Gogić
 Đorđe Rakić
 Denis Popović
 Martí Crespí
 Joan Verdú
 Francisco Sandaza
South America
 Cléo
 Yuri de Souza

References

External links

 Official website 

 
Defunct football clubs in China
2013 establishments in China
Association football clubs disestablished in 2022
Association football clubs established in 2013
2022 disestablishments in China
Sport in Qingdao